Dagboek van een Oude Dwaas  is a 1987 Dutch film directed by Lili Rademakers. It is based on a book by the Japanese writer Jun'ichirō Tanizaki. The film's international title is Diary of a Mad Old Man.

The film was selected for the Semaine de la Critique from the Cannes film festival in 1988.

Plot 
Hamelinck, an already old man, suffers from a severe muscle disease and must stop working. It bothers him not long, because he gets under the spell of his daughter-in-law Simone. He admired her for years already, but now overwhelms her with gifts and treats her like a queen. He acts also submissive and is delighted as he can touch her leg. Just before he dies, Hamelinck makes the wish to get Simone’s footprints on his memorial stone.

Cast
Ralph Michael	... 	Marcel Hamelinck
Beatie Edney	... 	Simone
Suzanne Flon	... 	Denise Hamelinck
Derek de Lint	... 	Philippe
Dora van der Groen	... 	Zuster Alma
Ina van der Molen	... 	Karin
Stef Baeyens		
Camilia Blereau		
Sjarel Branckaerts		
Carry Goossens		
Daan Hugaert

External links 
 

Dutch drama films
1987 films
1980s Dutch-language films
Films based on Japanese novels
Films based on works by Jun'ichirō Tanizaki